Ben Hobbs (born 16 September 2003) is a professional Australian rules footballer playing for the Essendon Football Club in the Australian Football League (AFL). He was drafted by Essendon with their first pick in the 2021 AFL draft, number 13 overall.

AFL career
At the 2021 AFL draft, Essendon selected Hobbs with their first pick, no. 13 overall. Hobbs made his debut for the Bombers in round 5 of the 2022 AFL season, and was later nominated for the 2022 AFL Rising Star in round 14.

References

External links

Living people
2003 births
Essendon Football Club players
Greater Western Victoria Rebels players
Australian rules footballers from Victoria (Australia)